E series may refer to:
 BMC E-series engine, a series of automobile engines
 Electronic E series of preferred numbers, a series of preferred values for electronic components such as resistors, capacitors, inductors, zener diodes
 Entwicklung series, a late World War II German standardised tank series
 Ford E series (Econoline/Club Wagon), a series of vans
 Honda E engine, a series of automobile engines
 Honda E series, a collection of humanoid robots
 HP E series, a series of digital cameras
 Intel Xeon E series, a line of server-class CPUs.
 Nokia Eseries, Nokia business-oriented smartphones
 QI (E series), the fifth series of the TV quiz show QI
 Robot E-Series, a fictional line of robots created by Dr. Ivo "Eggman" Robotnik in the Sonic the Hedgehog series of video games.
 Embraer E-Jet Family

See also
 Formula E (disambiguation)
 Series (disambiguation)
 E number (disambiguation)
 E (disambiguation)
 D series (disambiguation)
 F series (disambiguation)